Arachnophobia is the state of being afraid of spiders. Other uses include:
Arachnophobia (film), a 1990 American comedy-horror film starring Jeff Daniels
Arachnophobia (video game)
Arachnophobiac, an album by Michael Schenker Group, 2003
Araknofobia, a 1990s electronic music group